Hurricane Nora was a large tropical cyclone that made landfall in southern Mexico, and later went to affect Baja California. The fourteenth named storm, and fifth hurricane of the 2021 Pacific hurricane season, the system was first monitored by the National Hurricane Center (NHC) as an area of low pressure near the coast of Mexico. It intensified into Tropical Depression Fourteen-E, but the depression struggled to develop as a result of wind shear. It further intensified to a tropical storm and was named Nora as it tracked west-northwest. According to the National Hurricane Center's Tropical Cyclone Report, three direct deaths occurred as a result of Nora.

Meteorological history 

Hurricane Nora originated from a tropical wave that emerged off Africa on August 13. It quickly moved westward over next few days, and at 15:00 UTC of August 19 as it moved into the Caribbean Sea, the National Hurricane Center (NHC) first indicated the possible development of an area of low pressure to the south of the coast of Mexico, giving it a 20% chance of forming in the next five days. The NHC further raised the system's probability of intensification occurrence to "medium" and then to "high" on the next day, and by August 24, a broad area of low pressure formed over warm sea surface temperatures. Scatterometer data on August 25 reported that a well-defined but small area of circulation inside the low-pressure area and was producing near tropical storm-force winds, with the NHC designating the disturbance as a tropical depression at 12:00 UTC of August 25. 6 hours later at 18:00 UTC, scatterometer data prompted the system's upgrade to a tropical storm, gaining the name Nora. Nora continued westward over a favorable environment for development. It became disorganized that night, with its convection being displaced to the northwest due to wind shear, as evidenced by satellite and microwave imageries. 

Nora began to turn slightly northwest by the next day, with a decline in wind shear allowing the storm to strengthen and develop convection on August 27. Nora then began to turn north-northwestward, with it forming an eye on August 28. Its developing inner core became wrapped by deep convection with cold cloud tops, and by 12:00 UTC, Nora was upgraded to a Category 1 hurricane. At 15:00 UTC, microwave imagery showed that it had a closed eyewall.

Preparations

On August 30, the National Hurricane Center issued a hurricane warning from San Blas, Nayarit to Altata, Sinaloa. Hurricane watches and tropical storm warnings were issued in Altata to Topolobampo. Tropical storm watches were put in place from Cabo San Lucas and La Paz, Baja California Sur.

The Servicio Meteorológico Nacional called for extreme precaution in the states of Colima, Michoacán, Guerrero, Oaxaca, and Jalisco. It was recommended for locals to get away from beaches and other low-lying areas that could be affected by high waves, avoid parking in wave-prone areas, and to go to safe areas defined by authorities. People who lived in areas threatened by Nora's flooding were monitored to give them the resources needed in the aftermath if they were affected.

Impact
Heavy rainfall occurred across the western coast of Mexico, with  being recorded across coastal regions in Guerrero, Colima, Michoacán, Jalisco, Nayarit, and Sinaloa. A peak rainfall total of  occurred at Melchor Ocampo, Michoacán. The storm left impacts in 44 municipalities and approximately 355,000 people without power. 30 rivers in Mexico had overflowed due to the flooding. Overall, three people were killed, and damage was estimated at US$125 million.

In Chiapas, the body of a member of the Mexican Air Force was later found after he had been swept away by the strong currents.
Severe damage occurred across Jalisco. In Puerto Vallarta, a bridge collapsed into the Cuale River, and buildings near the river were damaged. Overflowing rivers, falling trees, fallen power lines, and landslides prompted the closure of the GuadalajaraColima highway and the El Grullo-Ciudad Guzmán state highway. A construction worker also died in a landslide on a road connecting Ciudad Guzmán and San Gabriel. The Arroyo El Pedregal river overflowed in Melaque, Cihuatlán municipality, damaging at least 500 homes. Two people were reported missing in the municipality. The Bahía de Banderas was evacuated as the level of the Ameca River continued to increase, with a temporary shelter being established in San Vicente. Power outages were reported in the former city as a result of downed electrical lines and poles. A child also died in the collapse of a hotel, which was associated with Nora, and another person was reported to be missing. On September 5, a fisherman's body was found at a beach in Marquelia, Guerrero. In Ciudad Guzmán, flooding from the Los Volcanes river inundated some urban areas.
The Government of Michoacán declared states of emergency for the municipalities of Arteaga, Lázaro Cárdenas, Tumbiscatio, Aquila, and Coahuayana in the wake of Nora. A road leading to Uruapan also collapsed and was closed by authorities. Landslides also damaged a highway between Uruapan and Lombardí. Mudslides made a road leading to the city of Morelia impassable. In the Port of Lázaro Cárdenas, the Acalpican river overflowed, causing flooding on August 29. There also were reports of other floods, landslides, and uprooted trees in Michoacán. In the municipal seat of Arteaga, the Toscano river flooded, which caused several cars to be dragged by the flow. Multiple homes and businesses were damaged.

Aftermath
Federal, state, and municipal authorities worked on coastal roads to help restore communication damage caused by downed lines and trees.

See also 

 Weather of 2021
 Tropical cyclones in 2021
 List of Category 1 Pacific hurricanes
 Other storms of the same name
 Hurricane Manuel (2013)

References

External links 

The NHC's Advisory archive on Hurricane Nora

Category 1 Pacific hurricanes
2021 Pacific hurricane season
August 2021 events
Tropical cyclones in 2021
2021 in Mexico
Pacific hurricanes in Mexico